Tanjung Priok is a district of North Jakarta, Indonesia. It hosts the western part of the city's main harbor, the Port of Tanjung Priok (located in Tanjung Priok District and Koja District). The district of Tanjung Priok is bounded by Laksamana Yos Sudarso Tollway and Sunter River canal to the east, by Kali Japat, Kali Ancol, and the former Kemayoran Airport to the southwest, by Sunter Jaya Road and Sunter Kemayoran Road to the south, and by Jakarta Bay to the north.

History

Before human development, the coastal area of what is now Tanjung Priok was an area of brackish water with swamp and mangrove forest.

The old harbor of Jakarta 
During the colonial era, Batavia at first relied on the Sunda Kelapa harbor area. This meant that Batavia had a harbor system like many others cities. I.e. an anchorage at sea at some distance from the city, and a city harbor where smaller ships could attach to a quay. It meant that big ships like the Dutch East Indiamen and later ships safely anchored at some distance from Batavia, at what was called the 'harbor' of Batavia. Passengers and cargo then had to be trans-loaded on smaller ships, that would actually land these on one of the quays of Batavia.

The 'outer harbor' situation of Batavia became problematic when the natural harbor of Singapore became a competitor. In Singapore ocean-going ships could directly attach to a quay. The effect was that for many Dutch East-Indian commodities, it was cheaper to ship via the more distant harbor of Singapore. (At Batavia, a sea going ship from e.g. Surabaya, would have to unload its cargo into boats that sailed to a quay in Batavia proper. Later these boats would have to be used again to load the cargo into a ship to the Netherlands. The same ship could sail to Singapore, and directly unload at a quay. This eliminated the step to transload on boats.)

Plans for the new harbor 
The goal of the Tanjung Priok harbor plans was to create a harbor where ocean-going ships could attach to a quay. The increased traffic which resulted from the opening of the Suez Canal contributed to these plans, but the rationale centered on eliminating the need for trans-loading. The effect would be that commodities produced in the Dutch East Indies could be brought to the Batavia warehouses more cheaply. This would put Batavia, and Dutch ships at a more equal foot to Singapore and English ships. In turn, scale effects, i.e. regular supply of cargo, would further redress the balance for Dutch shipping.

Construction of Tanjung Priok harbor 
The construction of the new harbor was started in 1877 by Governor General Johan Wilhelm van Lansberge (1875–1881). The new harbor was named Tandjong Priok. The construction of the harbor was a major project.

Several facilities were built to support the function of the new harbor. Repair facilities were provided by Tanjung Priok Dock of 4,000 tons. A railway connection was established by building Tanjung Priuk Station (1914) and connecting it to the existing rail network.

Spelling 
Tanjung Priok is variously spelled in history as "Tandjong Priok", "Tandjoeng Priok" or "Tanjon Preeq".

Riots 

Tanjung Priok was the site of a widely publicized incident on September 12, 1984, when army forces fired on a group of Muslim protesters. The protesters were demonstrating against proposed government regulations that would require all formal organisations in the country to adopt Pancasila as their ideology. There were conflicting reports about the total death toll, but most sources indicate that several hundred protesters were killed. After the fall of Suharto the case was taken up again, and in 2003 fourteen people, among them a former commander of the Kopassus special forces unit, were named as suspects in the 1984 killings.

Kelurahan (urban villages)
The district of Tanjung Priok is divided into seven kelurahan (urban villages):
Tanjung Priok - area code 14310
Kebon Bawang - area code 14320
Sungai Bambu  - area code 14330
Papanggo - area code 14340
Warakas - area code 14340
Sunter Agung - area code 14350
Sunter Jaya - area code 14350

Important places

Port of Tanjung Priok
Tanjung Priuk railway station (1914) 
Jakarta International Stadium
On November 20, 2011, the Jakarta administration inaugurated the city's first railways tourism package aimed at attracting more tourists and reducing traffic congestion from Gambir railway station to the Tanjung Priuk railway station.

See also
List of East Asian ports

References

External links
Official site of Port of Tanjung Priok 

Districts of Jakarta
North Jakarta